Aliabad (also Romanized as ‘Alīābād; also known as Ali Abad Rostag and Robāţ-e ‘Alīābād) is a village in Galehzan Rural District, in the Central District of Khomeyn County, Markazi Province, Iran. At the 2006 census, its population was 39, in 15 families.

References 

Populated places in Khomeyn County